The 1990 Nicholls State Colonels football team represented Nicholls State University as an independent during the 1990 NCAA Division I-AA football season. Led by fourth-year head coach Phil Greco, the Colonels compiled a record of 5–6. Nicholls State played home games at John L. Guidry Stadium in Thibodaux, Louisiana.

Schedule

References

Nicholls State
Nicholls Colonels football seasons
Nicholls State Colonels football